The International Harvester Scout is an off-road vehicle produced by International Harvester from 1961 to 1980. A precursor of more sophisticated SUVs to come, it was created as a competitor to the Jeep, and it initially featured a fold-down windshield. The Scout and second-generation Scout II were produced in Fort Wayne, Indiana, as two-door trucks with a removable hard top with options of a full-length roof, half-cab pickup, and/or soft top.

Origin 

International Harvester began building trucks and pickups in 1907. In 1953, International added a truck-based people carrier, the Travelall.  During the late 1950s, International began to design a competitor for the two-door Jeep CJ 4x4. The 1961 model year Scout 80 made its debut in late 1960.

Later, chief designer Ted Ornas recalled:
...the market potential for a four-wheel drive recreational vehicle was an unknown quantity in the early 1950s. The only such vehicle offered in the post-war period was the Willys Jeep, a version of the military jeep produced for World War II. It was a flat-sided bare-bones product, and American military personnel learned to appreciate its ability to maneuver over rough terrain. Sales volume was very low. In early 1958, we were directed to develop a concept proposal to enter this small market of that time. So help me, Mr. Reese, manager of engineering, said 'design something to replace the horse.' There was no product definition to use as a guide. It was even proposed to use the defunct Henry J body tooling. Compound body surfaces were considered too far out for this type of vehicle. The military jeep was thought to have the correct appearance. Our design sketches with the flat-side, no-contour look never excited the executive committee. The program began to die. One night while sitting at our kitchen table (full of frustration and desperation), I dashed off this rough sketch on a piece of scrap mat board. It had contoured sides and was designed for plastic tooling. The next morning it was shown to a committee member. He reviewed it with controlled enthusiasm, but revived interest in the program. We were off and running. Goodyear produced many plastic parts for WWII and had formed a large plastic engineering group. We entered a program with them, a scale model was vacuum formed to simulate body assembly. This model received executive approval for appearance. By July 1959, Goodyear completed their costing, and because of the high costs, the plastic program was cancelled. By this time, the contoured design met with executive approval and a decision was made to convert the body design to steel. Starting in late July 1959, a full-sized clay model was completed, and in November 1959, it was approved. Looking back, it was a remarkable program with fast-paced engineering and manufacturing developments. The total development time of 24 months was an heroic achievement considering the concept was unique and no in-house engine or manufacturing was available or even considered when the program started.

"The first Scout was introduced in 1960. A concept for its replacement was initiated in 1964 and approved for production in mid-1965. The Scout II was introduced in 1971. The basic sheet metal remained unchanged until production stopped on October 21, 1980. During the 20-year period (1960–1980), 532,674 Scouts were produced. The Scout, introduced as a commercial utility pickup in 1960, set the stage for future four-wheel drive recreational vehicles of the 1970s, 1980s and 1990s.
Print slogans and marketing jingles during the 1970s signaled its appeal in the words, "International Scout:  Anything less is just a car."

Scout models and variants 
Scout models include the:
Scout 80 (1960–1965): The original.
Scout 800 (1966–1971): Same overall design as original with upgrades (electric wipers, newer engines, etc.).
Scout 810 (1971): Some early Scout IIs contain Scout 810 badging on the glove box.
Scout II (1971–1980): The later standard production model with a removable soft or hard top (100-in wheelbase).
Scout II Terra (1976–1980): The light pickup truck version (118-in wheelbase).
Scout II Traveler (1976–1980): This version had a removable fiberglass hardtop, and optional third row of seats (118-in wheelbase).
Super Scout II (1977–1979): This model had removable fabric doors, a rollbar, and soft top. The soft-top model was tagged the "SSII" by IH marketing. Eventually, the "SS" letters were assumed to stand for "Super Scout", the name this model is called presently.

Scout 80 

Scout 80s were built between 1960 and 1965. These models were identifiable by removable sliding side windows in 1960–1961 and even some very early 1962 models, a fold-down windshield, vacuum windshield wipers mounted to the top of the windshield, and an IH logo in the center of the grille and tailgate. The Scout 80 had the gasoline-powered 152 four-cylinder as its standard engine.

Red Carpet series
The first special package was the "Red Carpet" series, celebrating the 100,000th Scout manufactured by International, and only 3,000 were produced. This model had a red interior with a white exterior, full-length headliner, full floor mats, and a special medallion that was silver plated affixed to the door which read "Custom". This Scout was a step up from regular ones; it was marketed to attract more people, and was often advertised with women in mind. Each International dealer in the United States received one Red Carpet series Scout to be used in parades, in the showroom, and for promotional purposes.

Scout 80 Campermobile

During the early 1960s, International experimented with a camper body permanently mounted to the Scout 80. The roof was raised to nearly double the original height (to allow standing upright inside), tented sleeping bunks folded out of the sides, and the rear of the body was extended significantly. The tailgate/liftgate system was replaced with one large ambulance-style swinging door. Plans included that the unit could be purchased as a stripped-down shell ($960 installed), or as a "deluxe" unit, which included a dinette set, stand-up galley, and a screened chemical toilet that retracted into the wall ($1850 installed). The May 1963 issue of Mechanix Illustrated contains a full-color advertisement for the Scout Camper on the inside cover, which features two artist's renderings of the unit and a form to fill out and send in for free literature. The camper showed up again in the May 1963 issue of Popular Science, this time in an actual photo as part of a two-page article about pickup campers. Production of these units was low due to limited orders, and they are now rare.

Early Scout 800

It is known that Scout 80s were built in 1965 and the new 800 was developed during 1966. However, some scouts built later in the year 1965 are considered a Scout 800 as indicated by the VIN tag and Line Setting Ticket (LST). An assumed 3000 of these 1965 1/2 Scouts exist which make them interesting to study how manufacturers will use what's left in the parts bin from the previous model to build the new model. Some notable parts used in the piecing together these new 800 models were the hood that retained the tie down loop that would hold down the folding windshield. The reason this is significant is because the new 800 windshield doesn't fold down. Also, the front grill was that of 80 but now used on the new 800. it featured a gold plated IH emblem on a black backing piece secured to a durable and stylish wire mesh grill. Axles is a major detail as well; the new 800 featured a stronger Dana 44. However, these early 800 models still got the weaker Dana 27 that was more prone to axle shafts breaking during heavy use off-road. Although the Dana 27 was still available if desired vs the Dana 44. The Dana 27 in Scouts was obsolete by 1968. By this time, these new 800 models were 4 wheel drive and standard equipment at that.

From here on, the Scout would be known as the Scout 800.

Scout 800 

The Scout 800 replaced the Scout 80 during 1965. The new 800 model was built from 1965 to 1968. These models had many improvements of comfort and design, including bucket seats, better instrumentation and heating systems, updated dashboard, optional rear seats, and optional 196 four-cylinder (from 1966), or 232 inline-six. Beginning in March 1967, a 266 ci V8 engine was also offered. Externally, changes were limited to an anodized aluminum grille with a rectangular "International" logo placed on the grille, the IH badge was moved to the hood, the door handles became the button type, and the tailgate no longer included the "hooks". In August 1966, the turbo version was complemented by the bigger 196 which used less fuel with exactly the same power. The 196 motor achieved 20 mpg. The turbo version was discontinued during early 1968. The fold-down windshield was still available, code 16536, but few were ordered because this was not advertised. The vacuum-powered wipers were moved to the bottom of the windshield frame with the fixed windshield.

Beginning in early 1966, International also offered the Scout 800 Sportop, which had an upgraded interior and a unique fiberglass top (also available as a convertible) with a slanted rear roof and a continental spare tire kit. The "Champagne Series" Scout was an upscale model offered in the Scout 80 and later Scout 800 models that featured a headliner, door panels, and carpet.

Scout 800A 

The 800A replaced the 800 during November 1968. Improvements included more creature-comfort options, a slightly different front-end treatment, drivetrain upgrades (heavier rear axle and quieter Dana 20 transfer case), and the options of a 196 four-cylinder, 232 six-cylinder, 266 V8, or 304 V8. The inline-six was only offered for a short period in early 1969. The 800A's grille was in three segments: the center grill and two matte-black headlight bezels. The Light Line of pickup trucks received bodywork similar to that of the Scout in late 1969.

The 800A could still be ordered with the Sportop (a slanted sporty top made of canvas or fiberglass), and later in Aristocrat and SR-2 packages. The Aristocrat was the final version of the original-bodied Scout. These trucks had a blue, vinyl interior, were painted blue and silver, and had a chrome roof rack; four-wheel drive was standard for most models.

Scout 800B 

The last of the 800 series was the 800B, available for less than eight months, from August 1970 until March 1971, before it was replaced with the Scout II. Other than minor cosmetic details (primarily chrome headlight bezels instead of matte black), it was identical to the 800A. It was only produced until the Scout II was in production.

The 800B was available with the Comanche package. This package included special paint and decals, chrome trim, sliding travel-top windows, and other "high dollar" options such as roof racks, chrome wheels, and upgraded interiors. Line tickets of the special-package Scouts (and some nonpackage units) were stamped. After the factory assembles the vehicle and the vehicle is shipped and sold, the line ticket identifies such things as the engine type, transmission type, drive line, paint codes, gear ratio, and standard and optional equipment, specific to that vehicle. This provides very valuable information when ordering parts later at a dealership. A variety of parts was used for these vehicles, so the expression "no two are quite the same" is not that fanciful.  Late in 1970, the Sno-Star package appeared (only with the six-cylinder engine), developed especially for snow-plow usage.

Scout II 

Scout IIs were manufactured from April 1971 to 1980. The design was finalized much earlier, with a version nearly identical to the production model shown to management during December 1967.

The Scout II is most identifiable by its different front grilles. The 1971–1972 Scout IIs shared the same grille, three horizontal bars between the headlights and chrome rings around the headlights. The 1973 Scout IIs had 14 vertical bars between the headlights, a split in the middle, seven bars on each side surrounded by chrome trim pieces and an "International" model plate low on the left side. The 1974–75 Scout II grilles were the same as 1973, with the addition of a vertical bar trim overlay. The 1975 had chrome and black, square trim rings around the headlights; 1976 had the same headlight trim rings as 1975, and a chrome center grille of 15 horizontal bars split into three sections was used in this year only. The 1977–79 Scout IIs used the same grille between the same headlight bezels the new chrome grille had two large horizontal bars with three vertical support lines and the "International" nameplate moved up to the center of the grille on the left side.

Scout II's could be ordered with the Traveltop, which was the full metal top, Roadster which was a half-cab variant seldom seen, or with a soft top.

In 1980, the final year of production for the Scout, the grille was a very distinctive design, available with black or silver, a one-piece grille with square headlights, made of Acrylonitrile butadiene styrene (ABS) plastic. Both grille color options had imprinted chrome trim around the headlights and an "International" name mark located on the left side.
Starting with late 1974 Scout IIs, disc and power brakes were standard features. Early 1974 models had disc brakes as a rarely selected option. Very few 1971–1979 Scout II's were ordered in RWD-only configuration, most were 4WD.

Before International discontinued the Scout in 1980, International experimented with Scout-based minivans, station wagons, dune buggies, Hurst-built special editions (in similar fashion to the Oldsmobile Hurst/Olds and Hurst SC/Rambler), and even a small motorhome. These plans were scrapped due to the International Harvester strike of 1979-80, and a lack of funds for the company to expand the Scout product line, let alone continuing production of the Scout itself.

The last IH Scout was produced on October 21, 1980.

Scout II Terra and Traveler

The Terra and Traveler were produced from 1976 to 1980. Terras and Travelers had fiberglass tops; half-cab for the Terra or full top with hatchback-type liftgate on the Traveler.

Scout SSII (Super Scout II)

The SSII (Super Scout II) was a stripped-down, off-road version introduced in February 1977. It was intended to compete directly with the Jeep CJ, and was built until 1979. This model included a soft top with soft doors, windshield-mounted mirrors, plastic door inserts, special plastic grille, and a roll bar, among other options. Several SSIIs were champions on the off-road racing circuit during the late 1970s.

Special packages offered on the Scout II

Shawnee Scout 
The Shawnee Scout was to be a trim type and special-feature package model produced by Hurst Performance. This model was built by dressing up a black SSII with special tomahawk and feather decals, special seats, a black targa-style top, hard tonneau bed cover, and of course a Hurst shifter. Only three Shawnee Scouts were produced.

CVI: Custom Vehicles Incorporated 
CVI: Custom Vehicles Incorporated (also associated with Good Times, Inc.) was a company located around the corner from the Ft. Wayne Scout Assembly Plant (Good Times was located in Arlington, Texas) that produced special models for IH dealers in 1979 and 1980. The special models were dressed-up Scouts with unique exterior decals and trim, center console coolers, and hood scoops.  Some versions had plastic window louvers on the rear side glass, fender flares, and two different plastic tailgate inserts. Model names included the Midnitestar, Terrastar, Travelstar, Shadow, Raven, two Classic models, GMS (Green Machine Sport), GMS (Gold Medallion Scout), Hot Stuff, Trailstar, Sportstar, 5.6-Liter, and 3.2-Liter models.

The "Selective Edition" Scout II 
This was a special package available from the factory. The 1978–79 package order code on the line ticket was 10992. The package included special gold accent stripes, gold-spoke wheels with Goodyear Tracker A-Ts, SSII black grille insert, and Sport Steering wheel. Other options available: Choice of powertrain, seats, interior, radios, cruise control, tow packages, air conditioning, all available in exterior colors 1032 Dark Brown, 6027 Dark Blue, 001 Black, or 5013 Green. This was available on the Travel Top, Traveler, and Terra models.

"Spirit of 76" and the "Patriot" special editions 
For the US Bicentennial in 1976, IH produced the Spirit of 76 and the Patriot models. The Spirit of 76 had a special blue soft top and blue/red side applique, and was only available on the Scout II. The Spirit also had blue interior, racing-type steering wheel, and 15x7-inch chrome rally wheels. IH data only show 384 Spirit models ever being built. Line ticket codes included: 
 
10876 for the side applique 
18696 to omit the hard top 
16928 deluxe interior 
16872 blue interior color 
9219 winter white exterior paint
885102 10–15 front tires 
925102 10–15 rear tires with spare 
29091 7-in chrome wheels

The Patriot had a hard top and the same blue/red side applique, but was available in a Scout II, Terra, or Traveler. Sales figures on the Patriot only show one Terra, seven Travelers, and 50+ Scout IIs were manufactured. However, another undetermined number of Patriots were built without line ticket code designations (the applique was applied at the Truck Sales Processing Center), making how many were actually built difficult to determine. Nevertheless, both models can be considered extremely rare.

The "Midas Edition" Scout II 
From 1977 to 1980, IH contracted with Midas Van Conversion Co. of Elkhart, Indiana, to build special luxury models to be offered through its dealers. These vehicles had swivel bucket seats, shag carpet, color-keyed interiors, door panels, headliner, grille guards, dual sunroofs, overhead clocks, third seats, reading lights, tinted windows, fender flares, and special side appliques and paint designs. Models included the Family Cruiser (or just Cruiser), the Street Machine, and Off-Road Vehicle. Another company named Van American (Goshen, Indiana) offered similar versions to compete with Midas; however, these vehicles were only offered for a brief time, making them very rare now. 
See one here.

Final "Special" version 
Probably one the rarest models ever produced by IH was the 1980 RS: the Special Limited Edition RS Scout. This version was only available on the Traveler in Tahitian Red (metallic). It had special extras inside and out, including polycast wheels with Tahitian Red (metallic) accent, luxurious plush all-velour russet interior including headliner and visors, special pin striping, wood-grain trim instrument panel and shift console, chrome bumpers, tinted glass, and more. Two other special versions offered in 1980 were the 844 and 434 Gold Star models. The 844 offered standard equipment plus a 345 V-8, HD clutch, T428 four-speed manual transmission, 2.72 rear axle ratio, AM radio, rear seat, hub caps, special black side applique and paint on lower body, and black carpet, while the 434 offered standard equipment plus 4–196 engine, T332 three-speed transmission, 3:73 rear axle ratio, black vinyl interior, AM radio, rear seat, hub caps, special black side applique and paint on lower body, and black carpet.

Monteverdi Safari

The Monteverdi Safari was made by Monteverdi, the Swiss brand of luxury cars, who used Scout IIs to produce well-equipped luxurious off-road station wagons. Two models were made during the late 1970s, the Safari, which had most of the bodywork changed, and the Sahara, which featured more limited changes, i.e. new grille and a more luxurious interior. Both were available with IH's SV-345 engine or Chrysler's LA 318 (5.7 or 5.2 L). The Safari was also offered with Chrysler's 7.2 L "440 RB" engine, while the lower-priced Sahara retained the Scout's original bodywork and could be had with the Nissan SD33 diesel engine.

Engines 

Engine produced by International Harvester:
IH 4-152
IH 4-196
IH SV-266
IH SV-304 (This is not the same engine as the AMC 304 V8)
IH SV-345

Built by American Motors Corporation
 AMC 6–232
 AMC 6–258

Built by Nissan 
Nissan SD33 (diesel) (naturally aspirated)
Nissan SD33T (turbodiesel— very few in 1979, and 1980 only)

International offered the Scout with a variety of engines over its years of production. The Scout 80 (1961–1965) had the gasoline-powered 152 four-cylinder as its standard engine. From 1965 to 1971 (Models 800, 800A, and 800B), engine options were the gasoline-powered 196 four-cylinder, AMC 232 six-cylinder, 266 V-8, and the 304 V-8. A turbocharged version of the 152 four-cylinder engine was offered from 1965 to 1967.

The Scout II (made between 1971 and 1980) had the following engine options: the 196 4-cylinder, 232 6-cylinder (early production), 258 6-cylinder (later production), 304 V-8, and 345 V-8. International never installed a 392 V-8 or an AMC V-8 into a Scout. At the time, International did not manufacture a diesel engine small enough to be used in the Scout, and so starting in 1976 used the Nissan SD33 diesel engine as an option. This engine was replaced by the SD33T turbo diesel engine in 1980. A very small amount of Scouts left the factory in 1979 with the Nissan SD33T turbo diesel engine.

Axles and gear ratios
Dana 27 axles were used for the front and rear wheels in the 80 and 800 models until around 1968. Both front and rear differentials were offset to the passenger side for the purpose of lining up the driveshafts with the Dana 18 transfer case. With the transition to the 800A model, the rear axle was upgraded to a Dana 44, with a centered differential mated to the Dana 20 transfer case (which had replaced the Dana 18). Some Scouts from this transitional time are a mix of old and new designs, with the rear driveshaft running at an angle. The front axle was still a Dana 27 model, though if the buyer ordered the 3500-lb axle option, the front axle was upgraded to a hybrid unit built from a Dana 30 center section and 27 tubes. The V8 engine option included an automatic upgrade to the heavier-duty Dana 30 axle. The rear axle shafts changed from two pieces to one piece around 1968 or 1969. A Power-Lock limited-slip differential was provided as an option for both front and rear axles. Common gear ratios are 3.31, 3.73, or 4.27, though nearly any ratio was available by special order (in at least one instance, a Scout 800 was shipped with a 5.71).

In Scout IIs, Dana 30 front axles and Dana 44 rear axles were standard until 1974, with front Dana 44 axles as a special order. After 1974, Dana 44 front and rear axles became standard on all Scout IIs. Available gear ratios were 2.72, 3.07, 3.31, 3.54, 3.73, 4.09, 4.27, and 4.54. Track-Lock limited-slip differentials were optional.

Axles originally had a tag bolted to their differential cover stamped with their gear ratio, but this tag often rusted off over time or was removed intentionally. The line ticket can be checked to identify the axle model, gear ratio, and whether it is equipped with a traction device, using an International parts code book.

Use in off-road racing 
Scout SSIIs were awarded honors for off-road racing during the late 1970s. In 1977, Jerry Boone, of Parker, Arizona, finished first among 4x4 production vehicles in the Baja 1000. Boone completed the run in 19 hours 58 minutes, crossing the finish line at Ensenada almost 2 hours ahead of his closest competitor: a Jeep CJ7. Only 9 of 21 vehicles that started the race finished the  course. Boone ran even faster than Class IV modified 4x4 racers. Mr. Boone later revealed that they only had a month to prepare a stock SSII for the race and they were not sponsored by IH until after the race.  Boone also won in 1978 at Riverside, California.

Sherman Balch, among many other accomplishments in off-road racing, won the off-road "world championship" in 1977 (the SCORE event in Riverside, California). Three other finishers along with Balch also drove Scouts. Balch also won the Baja 1000, the Mint 400, and three events in the fall of 1978 at Lake Geneva Raceway.

Sherman Balch and co-driver James Acker, driving a Scout SSII, later won virtually all major off-road races in 1982 offered on the West Coast/Mexico circuit by winning the Baja 250, the Baja 500, the Baja 1000, the Mint 400, and the Parker (Arizona) 400.

Line ticket 
When an IH vehicle was ordered, a factory plan or construction sheet was created (when the order was sent to the factory) with the new vehicle's VIN or ID number, and all the codes for standard equipment and options that the salesman used to create this vehicle for his customer or inventory. This sheet was used to assemble the vehicle from beginning to finish. After the factory assembled the vehicle and the vehicle was shipped and sold, the line [setting] ticket identified such things as the engine type, transmission type, drive line, paint codes, gear ratio, and standard and optional equipment specific to that vehicle. Different parts were used on the same model in the same year. A very small copy of the line ticket was attached to each vehicle during the building process at the factory. The location of the ticket varied: 1971–1976 Scout IIs had their copies mounted under their hoods, attached to the cowl cover panels. The 1977–1980 Scout IIs had their copies on the inside of the glove box doors, and 1969–1975 pickups and Travelalls had them attached to the back of the glove boxes; depressing the keeper tabs on each side of the box lets the box swing down to reveal the ticket. If lost, line tickets can be ordered through several Scout parts specialists, due to their diligence in maintaining these valuable resources.

Scout III SSV concept vehicle 
IH developed a concept prototype for the next version of the Scout in 1979 named the Scout III SSV, but due to the company's decision to discontinue the Scout product line, it was never put into production. The second prototype of the concept vehicle is displayed at the Auburn Cord Duesenberg Automobile Museum in Auburn, Indiana. It was a two-door with a sloped back window, built on a 100-in chassis with 162-hp V8.

Many people call this THE 1981 Scout. The SSV meant Scout Supplemental Vehicle, meant to be a limited production supplement to the regular model to help promote it, much as the Corvette supplements the Chevrolet line. While the SSV may have appeared in 1981 if it had reached production, designs existed for a new model in 1981 to replace the Scout II. Clay models of this showed an evolution of the Scout II into a more rounded body somewhat resembling the Chevrolet S-10 Blazer. The demise of the Scout line ended the SSV; the company continues to this day, having changed its name to Navistar in 1985 after selling the farm machinery business along with the International Harvester name.

Case IH Scout 
In 2010, Case IH started production of a UTV side by side utility ATV named the Scout and Scout XL, also sold as New Holland Rustler. These UTVs were built by Club Car.

https://www.reuters.com/business/autos-transportation/volkswagen-build-own-plant-us-scout-brand-automobilwoche-2023-02-24/==Revival==
In September 2021, a report by Motor Trend revealed that Volkswagen Group may look to revive the Scout nameplate as a potential competitor to the Jeep Wrangler, Toyota 4Runner, and the revived Ford Bronco. VW Group had acquired the Scout trademarks earlier in the year when its commercial truck business Traton acquired Navistar. As VW Group is unlikely to acquire the International Harvester trademarks from Case IH even for a licensing deal, a revived Scout would either be sold under the Volkswagen nameplate as a sub-brand similar to the aforementioned Bronco or as a standalone off-road themed brand similar to Jeep; both options would use VW's existing dealership network in the United States.
These rumors were confirmed when in May 2022, Volkswagen announced their intention to produce electric pickups and SUVs built in the United States under the Scout brand name. The first prototype is expected in 2023 with production models by 2026.  <ref> https://www.caranddriver.com/news/a39970134/volkswagen-scout-ev-revival/

References

Further reading

Banks, Michael. International Harvester Scout: The Complete Illustrated History. Enthusiast Books, 2018. .
Foster, Patrick.  International Harvester Trucks, The Complete History. Motorbooks, 2015. .

External links 

Binder Planet
Scout Light Line Photos
Scout History & Specs
Scout Image Gallery
1981 Scout 3 Prototype
Scouts West
Restored Scout Photos
Little Known Facts 

Photos of IH vehicles in the NATMUS museum
Facebook page dedicated to the 80 & 800 models

 

All-wheel-drive vehicles
Rear-wheel-drive vehicles
Full-size sport utility vehicles
1970s cars
1980s cars
Cars introduced in 1961
Scout
Economy of Fort Wayne, Indiana
History of Fort Wayne, Indiana
Transportation in Fort Wayne, Indiana
Slanted engines
Off-road vehicles
Pickup trucks